Aporocidaris eltaniana is a species of sea urchin of the family Ctenocidaridae. Their armour is covered with spines. It is placed in the genus Aporocidaris and lives in the sea. Aporocidaris eltaniana was first scientifically described in 2000 by Mooi, David, Fell & Choné.

Description

See also 
 Aphanopora echinobrissoides
 Aporocidaris antarctica
 Aporocidaris fragilis

References 

Ctenocidaridae
Animals described in 2000